Doug Miller (born July 14, 1954) is an American politician. He served as a Republican member for the 73rd district of the Texas House of Representatives.

Miller was born in New Braunfels, Texas. He attended Texas State University, where he earned a Bachelor of Science degree in law enforcement in 1976. He served as the mayor of New Braunfels. In 2009, Miller was elected for the 73rd district of the Texas House of Representatives, succeeding Nathan Macias. In 2007 he was succeeded by Kyle Biedermann. In 2022 he ran for membership  of the Eagle Mountain-Saginaw Independent School District, but was not elected.

References 

1954 births
Living people
People from New Braunfels, Texas
Republican Party members of the Texas House of Representatives
21st-century American politicians
Texas State University alumni